Post and Telecommunications of Kosovo (commonly abbreviated as PTK) is the postal and telecommunications authority of Kosovo.

History 
The company was founded in 1959, originally under the name of "The Post, Telephone and Telegraph of Kosovo", and adopted its current name on 12 September 1990. PTK stopped operating only during the Kosovo War. During the conflict, assets of the company were either stolen or destroyed, leading to interruptions of postal and telecommunication services. After the conflict, PTK launched Vala, the largest mobile operator in the country, with the assistance of Monaco Telecom. Vala was the first licensed mobile operator in Kosovo.

On 29 June 2005, Post and Telecom of Kosovo was transformed into a Joint Stock Company, with the new name PTK J.S.C. The authority has three business units: Post of Kosovo, Telecom of Kosovo, and Vala, its mobile operator unit. The units are licensed by Telecommunication Regulation Authority of Kosovo.

In operation since 2000, Vala is the largest mobile operator in Kosovo with approximately 1,150,000 customers. An LTE network has been built by Vala, powered by Alcatel Lucent and Nokia Networks.

Dialling codes for Vala are: 044, 045 and 046 (internationally +383 44, +383 45 and +383 46. Identification code (IMSI) of Vala is 221-01 (but still in use 212-01(Monaco)).

See also 
 Posta e Kosovës
 Telecom of Kosovo
 Telephone numbers in Kosovo
 Postal codes in Kosovo

Notes

References

External links 

  Post and Telecommunications of Kosovo
  Kosovo Telecom
 Mobile Operator Vala
 Landline Operator Telekom of Kosovo

Telecommunications companies of Kosovo
Kosovo companies